Ritya Glacier is the steep 1.8 km long and 1.4 km wide glacier draining the southeast slopes of Imeon Range on Smith Island in the South Shetland Islands, Antarctica.  It is situated northeast of Nosei Glacier, southeast of Kongur Glacier and south of Saparevo Glacier, flows southeastwards from Mount Christi and enters the head of Linevo Cove on Boyd Strait.

The glacier is named after the settlement of Ritya in Northern Bulgaria.

Location
Bulgarian mapping in 2009 and 2017.

See also
 List of glaciers in the Antarctic
 Glaciology

Maps
Chart of South Shetland including Coronation Island, &c. from the exploration of the sloop Dove in the years 1821 and 1822 by George Powell Commander of the same. Scale ca. 1:200000. London: Laurie, 1822.
  L.L. Ivanov. Antarctica: Livingston Island and Greenwich, Robert, Snow and Smith Islands. Scale 1:120000 topographic map. Troyan: Manfred Wörner Foundation, 2010.  (First edition 2009. )
 South Shetland Islands: Smith and Low Islands. Scale 1:150000 topographic map No. 13677. British Antarctic Survey, 2009.
 Antarctic Digital Database (ADD). Scale 1:250000 topographic map of Antarctica. Scientific Committee on Antarctic Research (SCAR). Since 1993, regularly upgraded and updated.
 L.L. Ivanov. Antarctica: Livingston Island and Smith Island. Scale 1:100000 topographic map. Manfred Wörner Foundation, 2017.

References
 Bulgarian Antarctic Gazetteer. Antarctic Place-names Commission. (details in Bulgarian, basic data in English)
 Ritya Glacier SCAR Composite Antarctic Gazetteer

External links
 Ritya Glacier. Copernix satellite image

Bulgaria and the Antarctic
Glaciers of Smith Island (South Shetland Islands)